Lieutenant-Colonel George Thomas Dorrell, VC, MBE (7 July 1880 – 7 January 1971) was an English recipient of the Victoria Cross, the highest and most prestigious award for gallantry in the face of the enemy that can be awarded to British and Commonwealth forces.

Military career
Joining the British Army at the age of 15, Dorrell served in the Second Boer War.

He was 34 years old, and a Battery Sergeant Major in the 'L' Bty., Royal Horse Artillery, British Army during World War I when the following deed took place for which he was awarded the VC.

Involvement in the Action at Néry

On 1 September 1914, at Néry, France, during a fierce attack by the enemy, all the officers of 'L' Battery were either killed or wounded, including the officer (Edward Kinder Bradbury) in command, who, although having had one leg taken off by a shell, continued to direct the firing until he died. Battery Sergeant-Major Dorrell then took over command with the support of a sergeant (David Nelson) and continued to fire one of the guns until all the ammunition was expended.

As brevet lieutenant colonel, Dorrell served as a company commander in the Home Guard during World War II.

His Victoria Cross is displayed at the Imperial War Museum in London.

References

Monuments to Courage (David Harvey, 1999)
The Register of the Victoria Cross (This England, 1997)
VCs of the First World War - 1914 (Gerald Gliddon, 1994)

External links
Location of grave and VC medal (Surrey)
The Néry Gun and Medals at Imperial War Museum Victoria Cross and George Cross Gallery
Per Finsted, The Affair at Néry, 1 September 1914, with map and illustrations
 

1880 births
1923 deaths
People from Paddington
Royal Horse Artillery soldiers
Royal Artillery officers
British Home Guard officers
British Army personnel of the Second Boer War
British Army personnel of World War I
British World War I recipients of the Victoria Cross
Members of the Order of the British Empire
British Army recipients of the Victoria Cross
Military personnel from Middlesex